CS2 or CS-2 or similar can mean:
Carbon disulfide (CS2)
A software suite by Adobe Systems (CS2), see Adobe Creative Suite#Creative Suite 1 and 2
A cycle super-highway in London (CS2), see List of cycle routes in London#Cycle Superhighways
CS gas as a very fine dry powder (CS2), see CS gas#Use as an aerosol
CS-2, a British supercomputer system produced by Meiko Scientific
Cities: Skylines II, a city-building game developed by Colossal Order set to release in 2023